Masindi–Biso Road is a road in the Western Region of Uganda, connecting the city of Masindi, in Masindi District and the town of Biso, in Buliisa District in the oil-rich Albertine Graben.

Location
The road starts at Masindi, the district capital and the largest city in Masindi District.

The geographical coordinates of this road between Masindi and Nyemigita are 01°39'31.0"N, 31°36'17.0"E (Latitude:1.658611; Longitude:31.604722).

Overview
This road is one of 12 roads earmarked for development, and upgrade to class II bitumen surface, by the Ugandan government, in preparation for construction of (a) Uganda Oil Refinery (b) East African Crude Oil Pipeline and (c) Kabaale International Airport. All this activity is in preparation for Uganda's first oil, expected in 2023. The twelve  roads are collectively referred to as the "Oil Roads".

Upgrading to bitumen
The government of Uganda has earmarked this road and two other roads for upgrading through the conversion of the existing gravel road to bitumen surface and the building of bridges and drainage channels. China Railway Seventh Group has been contracted by the Uganda National Roads Authority (UNRA), to upgrade (a) Hohwa–Nyairongo–Kyarushesha–Butole Road (b) Kabaale–Kizirafumbi Road and (c) Masindi–Biso Road. The three roads are budgeted to cost USh504 billion (approx. US$137 million).

Timeline and funding
The contractor agreed to start work in May 2019 and proceed for one year, without upfront payment. After one year, the government will pay for any completed work and pay for any subsequent work, as completed. In the meantime, the government is expected to search for a lender to fund the construction. Construction of all three roads is expected to last three years.

See also
 Economy of Uganda

References

External links
 Uganda National Road Authority Homepage
  Oil Sparks Roads Upgrade
 List of Oil Roads As of 11 December 2017.

Roads in Uganda
Masindi District
Buliisa District
Western Region, Uganda
Petroleum infrastructure in Uganda